Jan Renier Snieders (22 November 1812 in Bladel – 9 April 1888 in Turnhout), a brother of August Snieders, was a Flemish writer. He studied medicine in Leuven, and in 1838 he settled as a physician in Turnhout, where he did much to promote literature. For that purpose he founded the society De Dageraad. In 1912, the Hofstraat in Turnhout was renamed to Renier Sniedersstraat.

Bibliography
 Het kind met den helm (1852) 
 De meesterknecht (1855) 
 Doctor Marcus (1858) 
 De lelie van het gehucht (1860) 
 Narda (1869) 
 De geuzen in de Kempen (1875) 
 Zonder God (1885)

See also
 Flemish literature

Sources
 Jan Renier Snieders (Dutch)

1812 births
1888 deaths
Flemish writers
People from Turnhout